Mount Van Hoevenberg is a summit point located in the Adirondack Mountains in the Town of North Elba, Essex County, New York, 9 miles (15 km) east-southeast of the village of Lake Placid. Named for Henry Van Hoevenberg (1849–1918) (not to be confused with the American football player Henry Van Hoevenberg), it is best known for the location of the bobsleigh, luge, and skeleton  track, and of a network of cross-country ski trails. The Mount Van Hoevenberg sports complex was used to host the 1932 (bobsleigh) and 1980 Winter Olympics (bobsleigh, luge, cross-country skiing, and biathlon).

Mount Van Hoevenberg stands within the watershed of the West Branch of the Ausable River, which drains into Lake Champlain, thence into Canada's Richelieu River, the Saint Lawrence River, and into the Gulf of Saint Lawrence. 
The southwest slopes of Mt. Van Hoevenberg drain directly into the West Branch. 
The northern and southern slopes of Van Hoevenberg drain into the North and South Meadow Brooks, respectively — tributaries of the West Branch.

The mountain is part of the Olympic Regional Development Authority (ORDA). ORDA maintains the cross-country ski and biathlon trail system originally used in the 1980 Olympics.

During the summer, the mountain is used for hiking and mountain biking.

References

External links
 
 "The History of Mount van Hoevenberg Ski Area". The New York State Ski Blog.
 "Van Hoevenberg Trail". Trails.com

Van Hoevenberg
Ski areas and resorts in New York (state)
Tourist attractions in Essex County, New York
Mountains of New York (state)